Khenaman (also Romanized as Khenāmān and Khanaman; also known as Khināmān) is a village in Khenaman Rural District, in the Central District of Rafsanjan County, Kerman Province, Iran. At the 2006 census, its population was 441, in 118 families.

References 

Populated places in Rafsanjan County